KRT74 is a keratin gene.

Mutations in KRT74 cause hair and nail ectodermal dysplasia.

References